Xiazangke Township (Mandarin: 下藏科乡) is a township in Gadê County, Golog Tibetan Autonomous Prefecture, Qinghai, China. In 2010, Xiazangke Township had a total population of 5,132 people: 2,744 males and 2,388 females: 1,679 under 14 years old, 3,220 aged between 15 and 64 and 233 over 65 years old.

References 

Township-level divisions of Qinghai
Golog Tibetan Autonomous Prefecture